Uruguayans in Italy are people born in Uruguay who emigrated to Italy or Italian citizens of Uruguayan descent.

Overview
No less than one-third of Uruguayans are of Italian descent; and thousands of Italian-Uruguayans hold Italian passports. These reasons help explain why so many Uruguayans immigrated to Italy in search of opportunities. An important group of Uruguayan footballers are playing or played in Italian teams. There are also some Italian-born people of Uruguayan descent.

Expatriate Uruguayans have their own associations in Italy, notably the Italy-Uruguay Cultural Association and two Consultative Councils.

Notable people

Michele Andreolo, footballer
Abel Hernández, footballer
Nicolás Suárez Bremec, footballer

See also
Emigration from Uruguay
Italy–Uruguay relations
Italian Uruguayan

References

External links
 Uruguayans in Italy - Facebook page

Immigration to Italy
Ethnic groups in Italy
 
Italy